The James Thompson House in Anchorage, Kentucky, was built in about 1894.  The house's architecture is eclectic, with elements of Shingle Style and Queen Anne style, and by tradition it has been believed to have been designed by E.T. Hutchings.

It is a wood-frame house on a limestone foundation, with a modified gambrel roof.  Its front is asymmetrical and it has a porch around three sides of the house.

It was listed on the National Register of Historic Places in 1980.

References

19th-century buildings and structures in Louisville, Kentucky
Houses on the National Register of Historic Places in Kentucky
Houses completed in 1894
Houses in Jefferson County, Kentucky
National Register of Historic Places in Jefferson County, Kentucky
1894 establishments in Kentucky
Anchorage, Kentucky